Jorge Luis Sánchez (born 1960 in Havana) is a Cuban film director. He was a founder of the Federación Nacional de Cine Clubes de Cuba - the Nacional Federation of Cine Clubs of Cuba.

He started to work in ICAIC in 1981 as camera assistant, and later as assistant director.

His first feature El Benny was presented at the Locarno International Film Festival in August 2006, where its star Renny Arozarena won the Boccalino prize for best performance for protagonist in all sections of festival. The film was Cuba's candidate for the Academy Awards. Sánchez is distantly related to Benny Moré, the subject of this film. At the Latinamerican Film Festival in Havana in December 2006, Sanchez received an award for the film.

Filmography

Amigos 1987 fiction, 30 min., 16 mm. Taller de Cine Asociación Hermanos Saíz.
Diálogo 1988 documentary, 10 min, Vídeo Betacam. Taller de Cine Asociación Hermanos Saíz.
Un Pedazo de Mí documentary, 15 min, 35 mm. Taller de Cine Asociación Hermanos Saíz-ICAIC.
El Fanguito documentary, 1990 11 min, 35 mm. ICAIC.
El Habanero news, 1990 7 min, 35 mm. ICAIC.
Nietos y Abuelos documentary, 199013 min, 35 mm. ICAIC.
Donde Está Casal documentary, 1990 13 min, 35 mm. ICAIC
Adrenalina documentary, 199113 min, 35 mm. ICAIC.
El Cine y la Memoria documentary, 1992 13 min, 35 mm. ICAIC.
Atrapando Espacio documentary, 1994 24 min, 35 mm. ICAIC.
Y Me Gasto la Vida documentary, 1997 38 min, Vídeo Betacam. ICAIC.
Patinando La Habana documentary, 1997 26 min, Vídeo Betacam. ICAIC.
Culto a los Orishas teleseries doc. of 20 episodes, 1999 Video Betacam. Lucompa Producciones. Venezuela.
Las Sombras Corrosivas de Fidelio Ponce Aun documentary, 1999 52 min, Vídeo Betacam. ICAIC
Cero en Conducta documentary, 2003 13 min, Vídeo Betacam. ICAIC
El Benny drama/musical, 2005-6 126 min, 35 mm. ICAIC-Coral Capital Entertainment
Irremediablemente juntos drama, 2012 126 min, 35 mm. ICAIC-Coral Capital Entertainment
Buscando a Casal drama/biopic, 2019 126 min, 35 mm. ICAIC-Coral Capital Entertainment

See also

Cinema of Cuba

External links

  ICAIC's (Cuban Film Industry) Official Website

1960 births
Living people
Cuban film directors
People from Havana